Tashan (also known as Teshān) is a city & capital of Tashan District, Behbahan County, Khuzestan Province, Iran.

In 2006 Tashan was created by the former villages that came together: Chahardahi-ye Sohrab, Deh-e Ebrahim, Tall Kohneh, Ablesh, Masiri and Chahardahi-ye Asgar.

This city at the 2006 census, its population was 15,000 in 3,000 families.

References 

Populated places in Behbahan County
Cities in Khuzestan Province